St Carthage's Church is a Roman Catholic church in Lismore, County Waterford. It is included in the Record of Protected Structures maintained by Waterford City and County Council.

History 
St Carthage's Parish Church, built on the site of an earlier church, was constructed between 1881 and 1884. It was designed by architect Walter Glynn Doolin, and is an example of a Lombardo-Romanesque style church. The Church has held Catholic ceremonies since its opening. The current bishop is Alphonsus Cullinan and its current priest is Michael Cullinan.

Construction 
The church was built using red sandstone and white limestone. Its bell tower is 37 metres tall.

Above the main entrance doorway is a mosaic of Jesus Christ. A rose window surrounded by the symbols of the apostles can be seen above the mosaic. In front of this window stands a statue of St. Carthage.

References 

Lismore
Lismore, County Waterford